The 2022–23 AHL season is the 87th and current season of the American Hockey League. The regular season began on October 14, 2022, and will end on April 16, 2023. The 2023 Calder Cup playoffs will follow after the conclusion of the regular season.

League changes
After the previous regular season where teams played an imbalanced schedule consisting of 76, 72, or 68 games, all teams will now play an equal amount of games at 72. Standings will also be in order of points rather than points percentage (points percentage was used in the previous season, due to an imbalanced amount of games played per team). This also means the Macgregor Kilpatrick Trophy for the regular season champion will no longer be awarded based on points percentage, but rather total points.

For the first time since 2018, the league will be expanding, adding the Coachella Valley Firebirds. The Stockton Heat have been announced to be moving to Calgary in order to be closer to their NHL affiliate, the Calgary Flames.

Team and NHL affiliation changes
After the National Hockey League (NHL) added the Seattle Kraken for the 2021–22 season, the Kraken took a different approach than the 2017 expansion team, the Vegas Golden Knights. Seattle wanted to add an AHL expansion team for their first season, unlike Vegas. The Kraken had discussed the possibility of promoting the Idaho Steelheads from the ECHL, similar to what the league decided to do with the 2018 expansion team Colorado Eagles. However, Seattle chose to create their own expansion team in Palm Desert, California. The team, named the Coachella Valley Firebirds, was originally scheduled to begin play during the 2021–22 AHL season, however the debut of the Firebirds was delayed by one year due to the COVID-19 pandemic delaying the construction of their arena. With Seattle having no AHL affiliate for their debut season, they decided to affiliate with the Charlotte Checkers as the secondary affiliate to the Florida Panthers.

The Firebirds organization will be taking the spot of the Stockton Heat in the Pacific Division. The Firebirds join other successful AHL franchises in the Southern California market, such as San Diego, Bakersfield, and Ontario. The Panthers will become the sole affiliate of the Checkers.

Relocations

The Stockton Heat franchise was relocated to Calgary beginning with the 2022–23 season. The Heat had played the entire 2020–21 season at the Scotiabank Saddledome in Calgary due to the COVID-19 pandemic, with cross-border travel being restricted. On August 2, 2022, the team announced its name, bringing back the "Wranglers" moniker.

Affiliation changes

Coaching changes
{| class="wikitable"
|-
! colspan="4"|Off–season
|-
! Team !!  !!  !! Notes
|-
|Abbotsford Canucks || Trent Cull || Jeremy Colliton || On July 1, 2022, the Vancouver Canucks promoted Cull to assistant coach under head coach Bruce Boudreau. Colliton was named as head coach for Abbotsford on the same day.
|-
|Bakersfield Condors || Jay WoodcroftColin Chaulk (interim) || Colin Chaulk || On February 10, 2022, Woodcroft was promoted to Edmonton following the firing of Oilers' head coach Dave Tippett. Condors' assistant coach Chaulk was named the interim head coach the following day.Bakersfield removed the interim tag from Chaulk and named him as head coach for the 2022–23 season.
|-
|Calgary Wranglers || Relocated from Stockton || Mitch Love || As the Calgary Flames relocated the Stockton Heat to Calgary, the Flames retained Love as their head coach for the Wranglers.
|-
| Chicago Wolves || Ryan Warsofsky || Brock Sheahan || On July 28 2022, the San Jose Sharks hired Warsofsky as an assistant coach.
|-
|Cleveland Monsters || Mike Eaves || Trent Vogelhuber || On April 30, 2022, Eaves would be stepping away from his position as head coach of the Monsters following the conclusion of the 2021–22 season. On June 8, 2022, the Monsters named Vogelhuber as head coach. Vogelhuber had been serving as an assistant coach with the Monsters since his retirement in 2018.
|-
|Coachella Valley Firebirds || Expansion team || Dan Bylsma || Bylsma served as an assistant coach with then-Seattle AHL affiliate, the Charlotte Checkers, during the 2021–22 season. On June 21, 2022, Bylsma was named as head coach of the Firebirds. 
|-
|Hershey Bears || Scott Allen || Todd Nelson || On July 27, 2022, Allen was named as an assistant coach with the Bears NHL affiliate, the Washington Capitals. 
|-
|Ontario Reign || John WroblewskiChris Hajt (interim)Craig Johnson (interim) || Marco Sturm || After taking time away from the Reign on a personal leave of absence, it was mutually determined on March 11, 2022 between the Reign and Wroblewski that Wroblewski would not return as head coach of the Reign.Hajt and Johnson were named co-head coaches for the remainder of the season. On June 17, 2022, Sturm was named as head coach of the Reign, previously serving as assistant coach with the Reign's NHL affiliate, the Los Angeles Kings.
|-
|Rockford IceHogs || Derek KingAnders Sorensen (interim) || Anders Sorensen || On November 6, 2021, King was promoted to Chicago following the firing of Blackhawks head coach Jeremy Colliton.On July 12, 2022, the interim tag was removed from Sorensen as was named head coach for the 2022–23 season.
|-
| San Diego Gulls || Joël Bouchard || Roy Sommer || On May 11, 2022, it was announced that the Anaheim Ducks had parted ways with Bouchard as the Gulls head coach. Sommer was named as head coach of the Gulls on July 12, 2022 after initially being transitioned to a senior advisory role with the San Jose Barracuda.
|-
|San Jose Barracuda || Roy Sommer || John McCarthy || On May 18, 2022, Sommer transitioned to a senior advisory role with the Barracuda. On the same day, McCarthy was named as head coach of the Barracuda. Sommer was later named as head coach of the San Diego Gulls.
|-
|Tucson Roadrunners || Jay Varady || Steve Potvin || On July 18, 2022, Varady was named as an assistant coach with the Detroit Red Wings.
|-
! colspan="4"|In-season
|-
! style="width:15%;"|Team
! style="width:10%;"|Outgoing coach
! style="width:10%;"|Incoming coach
! Notes
|-
|Belleville Senators || Troy Mann || David Bell (interim) || On February 2, 2022, following the Senators game vs the Rochester Americans, Mann was relieved from duties as head coach. Assistant coach David Bell was named as interim head coach the same night.
|}

 Standings 

 

Standings as of March 18, 2023

 Eastern Conference 

 Western Conference 

 Statistical leaders 

 Leading skaters 
The following players are sorted by points, then goals. As of March 19, 2023.GP = Games played; G = Goals; A = Assists; Pts = Points; +/– = Plus-minus; PIM = Penalty minutes Leading goaltenders 
The following goaltenders with a minimum 1,200 minutes played lead the league in goals against average. As of March 18, 2023.GP = Games played; TOI = Time on ice (in minutes); SA = Shots against; GA = Goals against; SO = Shutouts; GAA = Goals against average; SV% = Save percentage; W = Wins; L = Losses; OT = Overtime/shootout loss''

Calder Cup playoffs

Playoff format
The AHL will continue to use the same playoff format used in the previous playoffs. The playoff field will include the top six finishers in the eight-team Atlantic Division, the top five finishers each in the seven-team North and Central Divisions, and the top seven teams in the 10-team Pacific Division. First Round match-ups will be best-of-three series; the two highest seeds in the Atlantic, the three highest seeds in each of the North and Central, and the first-place team in the Pacific will receive byes into the best-of-five Division Semifinals, with the First Round winners re-seeded in each division. The Division Finals will also be best-of-five series, followed by best-of-seven Conference Finals and a best-of-seven Calder Cup Finals series.

AHL awards

All-Star Teams

References 

American Hockey League seasons